Bywater may refer to:

People 
 Bywater (surname), an uncommon British surname

Places 
 Bywater, New Orleans, a neighborhood of New Orleans, Louisiana, United States

In Fiction
 In J. R. R. Tolkien's fantasy world of Middle-earth:
 Bywater (Middle-earth), a village in the Shire

Other uses 
 Bywater BASIC, a programming language

See also 
 
 
Bywaters